George Russell Boucher (December 13, 1899 – November 8, 1970) was a Canadian politician and barrister.

Born in Dunrobin, Ontario, Boucher (pronounced like voucher, not as in the French) was elected to the House of Commons of Canada in an August 1940 by-election as a Member of the Conservative Party to represent the riding of Carleton. He succeeded Alonzo Hyndman who died shortly after his re-election in the March 1940 federal election. He was a member of the Joint Committee on Location of the Seat of Government in the City of Ottawa. Boucher was re-elected in 1945 as a Progressive Conservative. He resigned his seat in 1948 in order to allow new party leader George A. Drew, who did not have a seat in the House of Commons, to contest Carleton in a by-election.

Electoral record

References

Notes
 

1899 births
1970 deaths
Members of the House of Commons of Canada from Ontario
Progressive Conservative Party of Canada MPs
Canadian people of Irish descent